Jean Proal (16 July 1904 – 24 February 1969) was a French writer.

Life 
He wrote some short stories aged twenty-four and twenty-five then his first novel Tempête de printemps at age 28.

Writers such as Jean Giono, Roger Martin du Gard, ... encouraged him.

Mobilized in 1939 in an artillery regiment, he was reformed in 1940 for health reasons. He had some difficulty in getting himself published, before signing at Éditions Denoël, and despite the critic Léon Derey, he was considered only as a writer following Giono and Ramuz. In 1942, he was transferred to Paris, where he tried to obtain the Prix Goncourt. He began to make himself known to the literary milieu, and received marks of esteem from authors such as Max Jacob, Blaise Cendrars, Jean de La Varende and Jean Rostand

His work amounts to a dozen novels, stories and short stories, and a few interviews.

In 1950 he came to live in Saint-Rémy-de-Provence where he became friends with Louis Aragon and painters such as Hans Hartung and Mario Prassinos. He abandoned his post as official (receiver at registration) and opened a store of electrical appliances in 1951.

He received the Grand prix du roman de la société des gens de lettres for De sel et de cendre in 1953 and was the first Prix de Provence for the whole of his work in 1961.

At his last moments in 1969, he wrote these words: "It is light that makes me breathe." He dies of a lung disease.

Works

Novels 
1932: Tempête de printemps, Denoël
1933: À hauteur d’homme, Denoël
1942: Les Arnaud, Denoël
1943: Où souffle la lombarde, Denoël, Prix Cazes
1944: Montagne aux solitudes, Denoël
1945: Bagarres, Denoël
1948: Suite montagnarde, Denoël
1948: Au pays du chamois, Denoë
1953: De sel et de cendre, Éditions Julliard
1955: Le vin d’orage, Julliard, 1955

Tales 
1950: Histoire de Lou, Éditions Gallimard, Collection Blanche

Essays 
 Camargue, Lausanne, Marguerat, with photographs by Denys Colomb de Daunant
 Chasse en montagne, Lausanne, Marguerat, 1962, with photographs by Charles Vaucher.
 Chasse en plaine, Lausanne, Marguerat, 1962, with photographs by different artists
 Magie de la Camargue, Ekkehard Presse, with photographs by Denys Colomb de Daunant.

Adaptation to film 
 The novel Bagarres was adapted to cinema by Henri Calef in 1948 under the same title Bagarres, with María Casares and Roger Pigaut in the main roles.

Sources 
 Jean Proal, une écriture saisissante, bulletin issue 1 de l’Association des Amis de Jean Proal, 2007

References

External links 
 Les amis de Jean Proal
 Jean Broal on Babelio
 Jean Proal, ecrivain-poète on Les Amis de Jean Proal
 Jean Proal, créateur d'humanité on Artois Presses Université
 Autour de Jean Proal, artistes d'hier et d'aujourd'hui on Archives des Alpes-de-haute-Provence  
 Jean Proal (1904-1969) on Sabenca Valeia

20th-century French non-fiction writers
People from Alpes-de-Haute-Provence
1904 births
1969 deaths